Lisa Lopez is a Tejano music singer who had a United States Billboard Regional Mexican Airplay number one single with "Si Quieres Verme Llorar" (1982) on the Hacienda Record label and produced by Rick Garcia. Lopez's core audience was targeted towards Mexicans, and became the first female Tejano singer to appear on the Billboard Top Latin Albums chart in October 1981. Historically, female musicians were commercially less successful than male performers. Lopez became a successful female Tejano singer before the genre's 1990s golden age, and was among the seven female singers who became popular artists; including Chavela Ortiz, Patsy Torres, Laura Canales, Shelly Lares, Elsa García, and Selena.

Lopez is the niece of Isidro Lopez and was musically similar to Lydia Mendoza and Chelo Silva. She signed a recording contract with Sony Discos in the early 1990s, though her recordings failed to impact any music chart. Lopez won the first Tejano Music Award for Female Vocalist of the Year, Tejano Music Award for Female Entertainer of the Year, and won in 1982 the Tejano Music Award for Song of the Year.

References

Notes 
 - Read online, registration required

Place of birth missing (living people)
Year of birth missing (living people)
Living people
20th-century American singers
20th-century American women singers
American women pop singers
American mariachi musicians
American musicians of Mexican descent
American Latin pop singers
American ranchera singers
Hispanic and Latino American women singers
Hispanic and Latino American musicians
Singers from Texas
Spanish-language singers of the United States
Tejano pop musicians
Sony Discos artists
21st-century American women
Women in Latin music